Fall Time is a 1995 film directed by Paul Warner and co-written by Paul Skemp and Steve Alden.  It premiered at the Sundance Film Festival in 1995.

Plot

Three friends decide to pull a prank and pretend to rob a bank when an actual bank robbery is taking place.  The real bank robbers take them hostage and force them to rob a bank for them.

Principal cast
 David Arquette as David
 Mickey Rourke as Florence Nightingale
 Stephen Baldwin as Leon
 Jason London as Tim
 Sheryl Lee as Patty / Carol
 Jeff Gardner as Ken
 Steve Alden as Officer Lyle
 Michael Edelstein as Bank Manager
 Richard K. Olsen as Officer Duane

Critical reception
Although it was nominated for the Grand Jury Prize at Sundance Film Festival (it lost to The Brothers McMullen), it never got domestic distribution in the United States.

Todd McCarthy of Variety did not care for the film:

References

External links
 
 
 

1995 films
Films set in the 1950s
Films shot in North Carolina
1995 crime films
American independent films
1995 directorial debut films
Films scored by Hummie Mann
1995 independent films
1990s English-language films
1990s American films